Kunle Adeyanju, also known as "The Lion Heart", is a Nigerian professional motorcyclist. He is President-elect of the Rotary Club of Ikoyi Metro, Nigeria.

Kunle Adeyanju is a self-described daredevil who has climbed Mount Kilimanjaro twice and motorcycled from Lagos to Accra over three days. In 2022, he became the first to ride a motorcycle from London to Lagos, Nigeria. The journey took him approximately, forty-one days; he traveled  through 11 countries and 31 cities before he arrived at his final destination Lagos, Nigeria. The goal behind his London–Lagos ride was "to raise funds for Rotary International's fight against polio, which remains a threat in Africa despite being eradicated in 2020." Hesays he chose the cause because of a childhood friend who had polio and died years ago.

Adeyanju is a native of Offa, Kwara State, Nigeria. Adeyanju completed his primary and secondary education in the country only and later attended Ahmadu Bello University, Zaria. When he was still on campus, Kunle joined the Rotary Club. In 2009, he pursued a course in postgraduate education and earned his master's degree. , he is doing doctoral studies in business administration with a specialization in social entrepreneurship at the University of Arizona.

References 

Date of birth missing (living people)
Living people
Motorcycle sportspeople
Sportspeople from Kwara State
Ahmadu Bello University alumni
Long-distance motorcycle riders
Year of birth missing (living people)